Göte Paulus "Vicke Hallon" Blomqvist (11 January 1928 – 28 February 2003) was a Swedish ice hockey player. Between 1947 and 1957 he capped 108 international matches and scored 68 goals. He won a world title in 1953 and bronze medals at the 1952 Olympics and 1954 World Championships. He was also a Swedish champion with Södertälje SK in 1953 and 1956 and the best Swedish scorer in 1951–53. He holds the record of most goals scored during one match (8) at the Swedish Championships.

After retiring from competition he worked as an ice hockey coach with Morgårdshammars IF, BK Remo, Enhörna IF and Södertälje SK.

References

1928 births
2003 deaths
Ice hockey players at the 1952 Winter Olympics
Olympic bronze medalists for Sweden
Olympic ice hockey players of Sweden
Olympic medalists in ice hockey
People from Södertälje
Södertälje SK players
Medalists at the 1952 Winter Olympics
Sportspeople from Stockholm County